The LeRoi Brothers are an American rock band from Austin, Texas.

The group was founded in 1981 by Mike Buck (also of The Fabulous Thunderbirds), Don Leady, Steve Doerr, and Alex Napier. The group was a long-running Austin bar band, but achieved national success with the album Open All Night, which reached #181 on the Billboard 200 in 1987.

Former member Alex Napier died on February 3, 2011, in Desoto, Texas from liver cancer, aged 59.

On March 12, 2014, The LeRoi Brothers were inducted into the Austin Music Hall of Fame.

Former member Evan Johns died from complications of liver disease on March 11, 2017, at the age of 60 in Austin, Texas.

Members
Mike Buck - drums
Don Leady - guitar, vocals
Steve Doerr - guitar, vocals
Alex Napier - bass
Joe Doerr - vocals
Jackie Newhouse - bass
Sarah Brown - bass
Evan Johns - guitar
Rick Rawls - guitar
Pat Collins - bass
Speedy Sparks - bass

Discography
Moon Twist EP (1981)
Check This Action (1983)
Forget About the Danger (1984)
Lucky Lucky Me (1985) (released as "Protection From Enemies" in the UK)
The LeRoi Brothers (1985) EPOpen All Night (1986)Viva LeRoi (1989)Rhythm & Booze (1990)Crown Royale (compilation)(1992)Kings of the Catnap (2000)Check This Action (Deluxe Edition) (2017)

External links
 LeRoiBros.com

References

Musical groups from Austin, Texas
Rock music groups from Texas
Musical groups established in 1981
1981 establishments in Texas